Glen Young (born 4 November  1994) is a Scotland international rugby union player. He currently plays for Edinburgh Rugby.

Rugby Union Career
Young begun playing top level youth rugby, most notably as a part of Newcastle Falcons Under 18s team in the 2012–13 season during which he played many games as a member of the club's A Team. During the next season Young become a regular member A Team. Highlights included a try against Bath.

In 2013 and 2014 Young played for the Newcastle Falcons in the Premiership Rugby 7s. In 2014/15 Young made his first team debut as a lock, in the Scotland Under 20 team. Young achieved a total of seven caps at Under 20 level. In 2014 he travelled to New Zealand in Scotland's Junior World Championship squad. In 2015/16 he was dual-registered with the Falcons as well as the Doncaster Knights.

Young stood out in a Newcastle squad destined for relegation to the RFU Championship in 2019. Briefly without a club, Young signed a contract with Harlequins ahead of the 2019-2020 English Rugby Premiership season.

Young signed a pre-contract agreement with Pro14 side Edinburgh Rugby in January 2021, alongside fellow Harlequins player James Lang.

In March 2022 he was called up to the senior Scotland squad for the 2022 Six Nations Championship. He received a full senior cap, coming on as a replacement in the third test match against Argentina on 16 July 2022.

References

1994 births
Living people
Scottish rugby union players
Harlequin F.C. players
Rugby union locks
Rugby union players from Jedburgh
Doncaster Knights players
Newcastle Falcons players
Edinburgh Rugby players
Scotland international rugby union players